Evenepoel is a Belgian surname. Notable people with the surname include:

Henri Evenepoel (1872–1899), Belgian artist 
Johan Evenepoel (born 1965), Belgian composer
 Patrick Evenepoel (born 1968), Belgian cyclist
Remco Evenepoel (born 2000), Belgian cyclist 

Dutch-language surnames